Swallow's nest may refer to:

 The Chinese delicacy (edible bird's nest) literally translated as "swallow's nest"
 The nest of the swiftlet
 Swallow's nest organ, a wall-mounted pipe organ
 Swallow's Nest, an architectural monument in Crimea
 Swallow's Nest (Blanding, Utah), a sandstone building in Blanding, Utah, USA
 Swallow's Nest, Tirilye, Turkey
 Rondine al nido ("Swallow's Nest"), a romance by Italian composer Vincenzo de Crescenzo
  ("Swallow's nest"), a decoration of military bands' uniforms.